Princess Sarah Jane Culberson, Lady of Bumpe, Bumpenya (born Princess Esther Elizabeth Kposowa in 1976) is an American philanthropist, public speaker, educator, writer and actress. By birth she is a Mende princess of Bumpe(Bumpe–Gao Chiefdom) in Sierra Leone. She is the co-founder of Sierra Leone Rising, a non-profit organization that raises funds to improve education, economic opportunities, and sustainable living for people in Sierra Leone. In 2009, she co-authored her memoir, titled A Princess Found: An American Family, an African Chiefdom, and the Daughter Who Connected Them All. The book is being considered by Disney for development as a film directed by Stephanie Allain with Culberson as executive producer.

Personal life 
Culberson was born Esther Elizabeth Kposowa in Morgantown, West Virginia, to an American mother and a Sierra Leonean father. She was placed into foster care as an infant and was later adopted by Jim and Judy Culberson, a couple in West Virginia. Her adoptive father was a professor of neuroanatomy at West Virginia University. Her adoptive mother was a special education instructor at an elementary school. She grew up not knowing anything about her birth parents. Culberson was raised in the United Methodist faith. Culberson played basketball, served as student body president, and was the homecoming queen at University High School. She received a theatre scholarship to West Virginia University and graduated in 1998. She later obtained a masters of fine arts degree from the American Conservatory Theater in San Francisco.

In 2004, Culberson hired a private investigator to find her biological parents. She discovered that her biological mother, a white woman from the United States named Penny, had died from cancer twelve years earlier and that her father, Joseph Konia Kposowa, was a member of a Mende royal family. Her paternal grandfather, Francis Kposowa, had been the Paramount Chief of Bumpe in Sierra Leone. As a Mahaloi, or granddaughter of the Paramount Chief, she is accorded the status of princess by the Mende people. She reconnected with her father after writing him a letter. Her father revealed that he had been a visiting college student when she was conceived, and he and her mother agreed they were too young and not financially suitable to care for a child at that time. Upon arriving in Bumpe, the chiefdom granted her the title Bumpenya, which is Mende for Lady of Bumpe.

Career 
In 2001, Culberson moved to Los Angeles to pursue an acting career. She has made appearances on the television shows Strong Medicine, In Case of Emergency, All of Us, Boston Legal, and The Secret Life of the American Teenager. She also had a role in the film American Dreamz.

From 2005 to 2007, Culberson was a dancer with CONTRA-TIEMPO, a professional dance company based in Los Angeles that specializes in Salsa, hip-hop, and contemporary dance performances. She now serves on the dance company's board of directors and continues to perform as a guest artist.

In 2006, Culberson co-founded Sierra Leone Rising, formerly known as Kposowa Foundation, a non-profit foundation that supports education, rebuilding of schools, and improving quality of life in the Bumpe Chiefdom of Sierra Leone after the civil war.

She worked as director of service learning at the Oakwood School in Los Angeles. As the service director, she organized a school service trip to Sierra Leone. She had previously worked at the Brentwood School, where she established a dance program.

In 2009, she co-authored the memoir A Princess Found: An American Family, an African Chiefdom, and the Daughter Who Connected Them All.

In 2019, Disney reached an agreement with Homegrown Pictures to develop Culberson's memoir and story into a film. An all-Black female team of scriptwriters and directors is expected to produce the film, with Stephanie Allain as producer, April Quioh as scriptwriter, and Culberson as executive producer and consultant.

In 2022, Culberson was awarded the Impact Award at Bounce TV's 30th Trumpet Awards.

Filmography

Film

Television

References

External links 
 
 

1976 births
Living people
21st-century American dancers
21st-century American women writers
21st-century American actresses
American adoptees
Sierra Leonean royalty
African-American female dancers
African-American memoirists
21st-century American memoirists
African-American women writers
African-American actresses
American television actresses
American film actresses
American contemporary dancers
American people of Mende descent
American people of Sierra Leonean descent
American women philanthropists
American United Methodists
Kposowa family
Organization founders
People from Morgantown, West Virginia
West Virginia University alumni
21st-century African-American women
21st-century African-American people
20th-century African-American people
20th-century African-American women
Philanthropists from West Virginia
African American adoptees